is the pen name of popular Japanese historical novelist . He was born in an area that is now part of the city of Suwa, Nagano Prefecture, Japan.

Career
His uncle was the famed meteorologist Sakuhei Fujiwara and his son is mathematician Masahiko Fujiwara. After retiring from the Japan Meteorological Agency, he began writing professionally. Originally a meteorologist, he wrote mainly on themes connected with mountains.

At least three of his documentary novels have been translated into English.  is based on an incident in 1902 in the Hakkōda Mountains.  is about the adventures of Frank Yasuda.

 deals with the Meiji era entrepreneur,  from northern Miyagi prefecture, who went to Canada in 1896 to export salmon roe back to Japan. In 1906, he chartered the schooner Suianmaru to smuggle 82 fellow villagers out of Japan and into Canada.

His 1973 two-volume novel  has been adapted into a manga series of the same title in which he is credited as writer.

References

20th-century Japanese novelists
Japanese meteorologists
Naoki Prize winners
Recipients of the Order of the Rising Sun, 4th class
People from Nagano Prefecture
1912 births
1980 deaths